Quain is a surname. Notable people with the surname include:

Buell Quain (1912–1939), American ethnologist
Eric P. Quain (1870–1962), American physician
John Richard Quain (1816–1876), Irish barrister and judge
Jones Quain (1796–1865), Irish anatomist
Kevin Quain, Canadian musician
Richard Quain (Irish physician) (1816–1898), Irish physician
Richard Quain (1800–1887), English anatomist and surgeon

See also
An Examination of the Work of Herbert Quain, a 1941 short story by Argentine writer Jorge Luis Borges
Quain Professor, the professorship title for certain disciplines at University College, London, England